Gwennole Le Menn (1938–2009) was a Breton writer, editor and lexicographer.
He edited various Old and Middle Breton works. 
Le Menn edited the Catholicon, a trilingual Breton-French-Latin dictionary of 1499, and he compiled a bibliography of Breton literature printed before 1700.

Bibliography
La femme au sein d'or. Des chants populaires Bretons… aux légendes celtiques ; Saint-Brieuc, Skol, 1985. (Breton folk songs and mythology)
Grand choix de prénoms Bretons; Coop Breizh. (Breton given names)
Les noms de famille les plus portés en Bretagne; Coop Breizh. (Breton surnames)
Le vocabulaire Breton du Catholicon (1499), le premier dictionnaire Breton imprimé Breton-français-Latin de Jehan Lagadeuc; Saint-Brieuc, Skol, 2001 
"Le breton et son enseignement", Langue française, Armand Colin, no 25 « L'enseignement des "langues régionales" », 1975, p. 71-8

References

French lexicographers
Breton-language writers
1938 births
2009 deaths
Rennes 2 University alumni
Writers from Paris
20th-century lexicographers